Barbara Gruber (born 15 December 1977)  is a German ski mountaineer and mountain biker.

Gruber was born in Bad Reichenhall. Like her parents and siblings, she passed the framer training. She started with sports after the birth of her son Johannes, at first with mountain biking. She became a member of the German ski mountaineering team and has been a member of the international Dynafit team since 2005. Together with her husband Herbert she lives near Weißbach bei Lofer.

Selected results

Ski mountaineering 
 2004:
 1st, Mountain Attack race
 2005:
 1st, German Championship single
 1st, Mountain Attack race
 2nd, European Cup team (together with Judith Graßl)
 3rd, European Championship vertical race
 3rd, European Championship team race (together with Judith Graßl)
 3rd, European Championship relay race (together with Judith Graßl and Silvia Treimer)
 7th, World Cup team (together with Judith Graßl)
 2006:
 1st, German Championship single
 1st, Mountain Attack race
 4th, World Championship relay race (together with Judith Graßl, Silvia Treimer and Stefanie Koch)
 8th, World Championship vertical race
 2007:
 1st, German Championship vertical race
 2nd, Mountain Attack race
 4th, European Championship vertical race
 2008:
 1st, German Championship single
 1st, German Championship vertical race
 1st, Mountain Attack race
 1st, Hochgrat ski rallye
 2009:
 1st, German Championship vertical race
 2010:
 1st, Mountain Attack tour
 2nd, Sellaronda Skimarathon, together with Judith Graßl
 2011:
 1st, Champ Or Cramp
 2nd, Sellaronda Skimarathon, together with Patrizia Wacker
 2012:
 8th, European Championship single
 10th, European Championship vertical race
 1st, Sellaronda Skimarathon, together with Judith Graßl
 1st, Hochgrat ski rallye

Mountain biking 
 2007:
 1st, "Glocknerkönig light" race
 1st, "Hochsteintrophy"
 1st, St.Veit mountain race team
 1st, Heutal mountain single time race
 1st, Bike Festival Kaprun
 1st, "Saalachtaltrophy"

References

External links 
 Barbara Gruber at skimountaineering.com
 Interview Barbara Gruber (German), M2b-Redaktion,  February 24, 2006.

1977 births
Living people
German female ski mountaineers
People from Bad Reichenhall
Sportspeople from Upper Bavaria